The 1988 season was the San Francisco 49ers' 39th in the National Football League (NFL), their 43rd overall, and their tenth and final season under head coach Bill Walsh. The season was highlighted by their third Super Bowl victory. They failed to improve on their 13–2 record from 1987, and the 49ers struggled to a 6–5 record at the midway point and were in danger of missing the playoffs for the first time since 1982, but rose to defeat the Washington Redskins on a Monday night, eventually finishing the season at 10–6. They gained a measure of revenge by thrashing the Minnesota Vikings 34–9 in the first round of the playoffs; the Vikings had upset the #1-seeded 49ers the previous season in the divisional round. The 49ers then traveled to Chicago's Soldier Field, where the wind-chill factor at game time was 26 degrees below zero. They defeated the Chicago Bears 28–3 in the NFC Championship game.

For the 49ers, it was their first Super Bowl appearance since they defeated the Miami Dolphins in Super Bowl XIX. They had made the playoffs in the three seasons between Super Bowl XIX and Super Bowl XXIII, but were eliminated each time in the first round, primarily because of the poor performances by their offensive stars in those games; quarterback Joe Montana, receiver Jerry Rice and running back Roger Craig all failed to produce a single touchdown.

The 49ers alternated quarterbacks as Montana and Steve Young both started at various points of the season. The broadcast booth of the 49ers radio network also saw change, as Joe Starkey substituted for longtime 49ers play by play announcer Lon Simmons during several games, mostly in October when Simmons called the Oakland Athletics 1988 American League Championship Series and 1988 World Series games for the Oakland A's flagship station, KSFO–AM. The 1988 season was the last for Simmons as 49ers broadcaster. With the regular season and postseason, the 49ers compiled a total of 13 victories (a .684 win percentage) on the season, a record-low for Super Bowl champions. In 2011, the New York Giants would tie this record (but with a .650 win percentage as they suffered seven losses as opposed to the 49ers six).

Offseason

NFL Draft

Training Camp 
The 1988 San Francisco 49ers season held training camp at Sierra College in Rocklin, California.

Personnel

Staff

Roster 

1988 Team Starters

Offense

 16 Joe Montana                   QB
 33 Roger Craig                   RB
 44 Tom Rathman                   FB
 85 Mike Wilson                   WR
 80 Jerry Rice                    WR
 89 John Frank                    TE

 74 Steve Wallace                 LT
 61 Jesse Sapolu                  LG
 64 Randy Cross                   C
 62 Guy McIntyre                  RG
 79 Harris Barton                 RT

Defense

 91 Larry Roberts                LDE
 95 Michael Carter               NT
 75 Kevin Fagan                  RDE

 94 Charles Haley                LB
 50 Riki Ellison                 LB
 99 Mike Walter                  LB
 58 Keena Turner                 LB

 22 Tim McKyer                   LCB
 21 Eric Wright                  RCB
 49 Jeff Fuller                  SS
 42 Ronnie Lott                  FS

Kicking Team

 6 Mike Cofer                    K
 9 Barry Helton                  P
 82 John Taylor                  PR
 25 Doug DuBose                  KR

Preseason

Schedule

Regular season 
In the 1988 season, San Francisco won the NFC West with a 10–6 regular season record, but it was a long uphill battle; the 49ers, Rams, and Saints all finished 10–6 with the 49ers winning the division on tiebreakers. The team had a quarterback controversy with Montana and Steve Young each starting at quarterback during the season. But after a 6–5 start, Montana led the 49ers to win 4 of their final 5 regular season games.

Montana finished the regular season with 238 completions for 2,981 yards and 18 touchdowns, and also added 132 rushing yards. His favorite target was Rice, who recorded 64 receptions for 1,306 yards (a 20.4 yards per catch average) and 9 touchdowns. Craig was also a key contributor with a total of 2,036 combined rushing and receiving yards and 10 touchdowns, earning him the NFL Offensive Player of the Year Award. Fullback Tom Rathman also made a big impact, rushing for 427 yards and catching 42 passes for 387 yards. The 49ers defense was led by defensive backs Ronnie Lott, Eric Wright, Jeff Fuller, and Tim McKyer, who recorded a combined total of 18 interceptions. McKyer led the team with 7, while Lott recorded 5. Linebacker Charles Haley was also a big contributor with 11.5 sacks and 2 fumble recoveries.

Schedule

Game summaries

Week 1 at New Orleans Saints 
{{Americanfootballbox
|titlestyle=; ;text-align:center;
|state=autocollapse
|title=Week One: San Francisco 49ers at New Orleans Saints
|date=September 4
|time=10:01 a.m. PDT
|stadium=Louisiana Superdome
|attendance=66,357
|weather=Indoors (dome)
|referee=Jerry Markbreit
|TV=CBS
|TVAnnouncers=Verne Lundquist (play–by–play) and John Madden (color commentator)

|road=49ers|R1=7 |R2=3 |R3=21 |R4=3
|home=Saints|H1=7 |H2=10 |H3=0 |H4=16

|reference=Pro-Football-Reference.com
|scoring=
First quarter
 SF (6:19) Craig 1 yard run (Cofer kick)49ers 7–0
 NO (13:36) Martin 2-yard pass from Hebert (Andersen kick)Tie 7–7
Second quarter
 NO (0:05) Clark 21-yard pass from Hebert (Andersen kick)Saints 14–7
 NO (6:13) Andersen 20-yard field goalSaints 17–7
 SF (8:05) Cofer 25-yard field goalSaints 17–10
Third quarter
 SF (3:55) Frank 9-yard pass from Montana (Cofer kick)Tie 17–17 SF (6:55) Wilson 17-yard pass from Montana (Cofer kick)49ers 24–17 SF (11:53) Frank 17-yard pass from Montana (Cofer kick)49ers 31–17Fourth quarter NO (1:34) Hill 18-yard pass from Hebert (Andersen kick)49ers 31–24 NO (8:27) Safety, Swilling tackled Young in end zone49ers 31–26 SF (13:20) Cofer 32-yard field goal49ers 34 26 NO (14:39) Perriman 15-yard pass from Hebert (Andersen kick)49ers 34–33}}

The Saints, fresh off the first winning season in franchise history, clawed to a 17–10 halftime lead in the second quarter, but Joe Montana erupted in the third with three touchdown throws. Head coach Bill Walsh, wanting to get playing time for backup Steve Young, put Young in for the fourth quarter; Young was sacked in the endzone for a safety and the Saints scored seven more points after that, nonetheless coming up short 34–33 to the 49ers.

 Week 2 at New York Giants 

Concerned over Montana's health, coach Walsh started Steve Young in his place against the Giants; Young's rawness to the Niners offensive system showed as he was limited to 115 yards passing and the Niners trailed 17–13 in the fourth. Montana came in and fired a 77-yard touchdown in the final minutes to Jerry Rice and a 20–17 Niners win.

 Week 3 vs. Atlanta Falcons 

The 49ers lost to the Falcons for only the fourth time since 1981 as Joe Montana was intercepted three times and sacked three times in a 34–17 rout. Gerald Riggs of the Falcons rushed for 115 yards and a touchdown.

 Week 4 at Seattle Seahawks 

The Niners rebounded by putting up 580 yards of offense in a 38–7 rout of the Seahawks. Joe Montana threw four touchdowns and Steve Young added a fifth while Roger Craig and Tom Rathman accounted for 186 rushing yards. The Seahawks' Jeff Kemp was intercepted three times and Kelly Stouffer added a fourth pick.

 Week 5 vs. Detroit Lions 

 Week 6 vs. Denver Broncos 
Joe Montana ran in a six-yard touchdown and threw for 191 yards and an interception; he was sacked three times and replaced by Young as John Elway tied the game 13–13 on a touchdown to Vance Johnson. Wind gusts up to 40 mph suddenly hit Candlestick Park and made passing more difficult; in overtime a Steve Young pass was intercepted (Young's second pick of the game), setting up Rich Karlis' winning field goal (16–13 final for the Broncos).

 Week 7 at Los Angeles Rams 
Roger Craig had one of his greatest games in a 199-yard stampede where he scored three touchdowns, highlighted by a dramatic 46-yard score in the first quarter. Despite three Jim Everett touchdowns the Rams fell to San Francisco 24–21, the tenth 49ers win in the rivalry's previous 14 games.

 Week 8 at Chicago Bears 
The Niners struggled to a 10–9 loss to the Bears on Monday Night Football. The Niners incurred ten penalties for 57 yards and Joe Montana was sacked four times.

 Week 9 vs. Minnesota Vikings 
The Vikings' playoff win at San Francisco the previous season hung over Candlestick Park as Coach Walsh started Steve Young in Joe Montana's stead. Young struggled and was booed repeatedly by the crowd ("They were running him out of town", lineman Harris Barton said). Just before the two-minute warning in the fourth quarter the Vikings led 21–17 with the Niners at Minnesota's 49-yard line; Young escaped a sack and ran in the game-winning touchdown, earning applause from the same audience that had been booing him; the NFL Films clip with Lon Simmons' call of the score is among the most replayed in retrospectives on Young's career.

 Week 10 at Phoenix Cardinals 
With Young still starting, the 49ers raced to a 23–0 lead in the third quarter, and Coach Bill Walsh felt it was the sharpest the offense had looked all season. The Cardinals, however, began clawing back as Neil Lomax rifled a pair of touchdowns; making matters worse for San Francisco was a whopping 14 penalties for 106 yards. On a kick return Walsh was blindsided by a runner and suffered two cracked ribs; he then had to watch as the Cardinals raced down field in the final minute and scored on a nine-yard Lomax score to Roy Green. It turned out to be the last road loss for the 49ers until Week One of the 1991 season.

 Week 11 vs. Los Angeles Raiders 
The low point for the 49ers season came against the Raiders as Joe Montana started despite continuing concern by Walsh over his health; Montana had lost eight pounds and was coming off a stomach illness. Montana was held to 160 passing yards as the Raiders clawed out a 9–3 win. The 49ers’ final drive stalled when officials did not call a pass interference penalty on the Raiders over a play to Jerry Rice inside the 10-yard line.

As a result, it was the second game of the season they didn't score a touchdown. Following the loss, amid chatter from players interpreted as them giving up on the season, Ronnie Lott called a players-only meeting; Harris Barton called it "a ‘screw the coaches’ meeting" and said that it worked to refocus the players on playing better ("They usually don't work, but this one did.")

 Week 12 vs. Washington Redskins 
The refocused Niners erupted on the defending champion Redskins, racing to a 23–7 halftime lead and winning 37–21. Joe Montana threw two touchdowns (including an 80-yarder to Jerry Rice) and ran in a third. Super Bowl MVP Doug Williams of the Redskins threw three touchdowns while Timmy Smith was held to just six rushing yards.

 Week 13 at San Diego Chargers 
The Niners' scoring explosion continued at Jack Murphy Stadium as Joe Montana threw three touchdowns (the first a 96-yarder to Jerry Rice) and Roger Craig had two rushing scores and a touchdown catch, while Doug DuBose added a rushing score. Four Niners backs plus both quarterbacks (Montana and Steve Young) rushed for 203 yards, crushing the Chargers 48–10.

 Week 14 at Atlanta Falcons 
The Niners traveled to Fulton County Stadium and limited the Atlanta Falcons to 177 yards of offense in a 13–3 win.

 Week 15 vs. New Orleans Saints 
The Niners hosted the Saints with both teams at 9–5 but going in opposite directions following two straight Saints losses. Led by Roger Craig's 115 yards, the Niners rushed for 152 yards and two scores while Joe Montana threw for 233 yards and a score in San Francisco's 30–17 win. At halftime, the 49ers retired number 87, which was worn by Dwight Clark from 1979 to 1987.

 Week 16 vs. Los Angeles Rams 
The Niners clinched the NFC West despite a three-way tie with the Rams and New Orleans (all finishing 10–6) and despite a 38–16 slaughter by the Rams that put them into the playoffs. Jim Everett threw four touchdowns while Montana and Young combined for 291 yards but no scores. San Francisco won the division on tiebreakers and the Rams were the wild card, while the 10–6 Saints were eliminated from playoff contention on the conference record tiebreaker.

 Game officials 
 Preseason 

 Regular season 

 Standings 

 Playoffs 

 NFC Divisional Playoff vs. Minnesota Vikings 

For the third time in some 365 days the 49ers hosted the Vikings, and for the second time in that span it was in the playoffs. Minnesota entered having shot down the Rams 28–17 and boasting an offense fourth in scoring with a defense second in fewest points allowed with a plus-23 turnover differential – and none of it made any difference as Joe Montana threw three touchdowns in the first half and Jerry Rice caught all three. Wade Wilson was picked off twice as the Niners won 34–9, their first playoff win since Super Bowl XIX.

 NFC Championship Game at Chicago Bears 

The Niners traveled to frigid Soldier Field a week after the Bears succeeded in the Fog Bowl against the Eagles and less than three months after San Francisco's ugly Monday Night loss in that same venue. The Niners put the game away in the third quarter following Joe Montana's third touchdown of the game as the Niners limited the Bears' sluggish offense (18th in scoring) to just one Kevin Butler field goal. The win was doubly personal for Walsh between returning to the Super Bowl and also quieting hecklers in the Soldier Field crowd, including one in particular who'd persisted in what Walsh delicately described as "remarks about my body parts and my preferences in life", but who was reduced to futile stuttering as the game got out of hand.

 Super Bowl XXIII vs. Cincinnati Bengals (at Miami Gardens, Florida) 

The game is remembered for the 49ers' fourth-quarter game-winning drive. Down 16–13, San Francisco got the ball on their own eight-yard line with 3:10 on the clock and marched 92 yards down the field in under three minutes. They then scored the winning touchdown on a Joe Montana pass to John Taylor with just 34 seconds left in the game.

49ers wide receiver Jerry Rice was named the Super Bowl MVP. He caught 11 passes for a Super Bowl record 215 yards and one touchdown, while also rushing once for 5 yards.

This was also the final NFL game coached by the 49ers' Bill Walsh. This was also the final Super Bowl that Pete Rozelle presided over as NFL Commissioner.

 Game officials 

 Stats PassingRushingReceivingKickingPuntingKick ReturnPunt ReturnInterceptionFumbleSacksTacklesScoringTeam Awards and records 
 Mike Cofer, Led NFC, 27 Field Goals
 Mike Cofer, Led NFC, 121 Points
 Roger Craig, Offense, UPI NFC Player of the Year
 Roger Craig, Led NFC with 2068 total yards
 Jerry Rice, Most Valuable Player, Super Bowl XXIII

 1989 AFC-NFC Pro Bowl 

 Media Pre season Local TV'''

Local Radio

References

External links 
 1988 49ers on Pro Football Reference
 49ers Schedule on jt-sw.com

San Francisco 49ers seasons
San Francisco
NFC West championship seasons
National Football Conference championship seasons
Super Bowl champion seasons
San Francisco 49ers
San